Operation Hurry was the first British operation in a series that have come to be known as Club Runs.

Background 
On 11 June 1940, Italy began the Siege of Malta, the first step in their plan to gain control of the Mediterranean.  Their plan was to bomb or starve Malta into submission, by attacking its ports, towns, cities, and Allied shipping supplying the island.  After over a month of bombardment, the troops on Malta were beginning to run low on supplies -including aircraft- to help fight off the attackers, and some doubt was expressed whether Malta was worth the supplies it required, and some even planned on letting Malta work on the few supplies it had left. The decision was made, however, to reinforce substantially the island air defences.

Movement 
The troops were informed of their mission, and the mission began.  Between 0800 and 0830 hours on 31 July 1940, Force H (including ) left Gibraltar, heading for Malta. To hamper air resistance during the transportation, an air attack was planned on Cagliari, alongside Operation Spark, which was meant to distract the Italians by reporting a suspicious boat off the coast of Menorca.

On the way to make the attack, Force H was attacked by two waves of enemy aircraft.  The attacks, which took place on 1 August at around 1800 hours, took place northwest of the coast of the Gulf of Bougie.  The attacks were successfully repelled.  On 2 August, at around 0230 hours, nine torpedo bomber Reconnaissance aircraft armed with bombs, and three bombers with mines, took off from the Ark Royal, however, due to inclement weather, one plane crashed, losing its entire crew.  This problem forced the pilots to wait until full daylight to take off, when the weather was better.  The attack was fought off with considerable anti-aircraft fire, however, the pilots still managed to hit four of the hangars, and destroy or damage several aircraft.  They also successfully laid three mines around the edge of the harbor.  All but one aircraft returned from this mission, the sole loss being taken as prisoner after an emergency landing. Operation Spark was also reported as successful.

All of the aircraft reached Malta.

Footnotes

References 

 
 
 
 
 
 
 

Aerial operations and battles of World War II
Battle of the Mediterranean
Malta Convoys
Aerial operations and battles of World War II involving the United Kingdom
July 1940 events
August 1940 events